All for One & One for All! is the first (and only) mini album by Hello! Project unit H.P. All Stars, released on December 1, 2004 in both a normal and limited edition, the limited edition having a different cover. It reached a peak of #5 on the daily Oricon charts, lasting 7 weeks. The concept behind the song was to show the fans appreciation and celebrate Hello! Project's seventh anniversary, whilst sending a message of peace.

The title track features every member of Hello! Project at the time of release; however, the coupling tracks were sung only by a few specially selected singers. On the normal edition cover, the members are arranged in the shape of the letter "H" on the front cover, and the letter "P" on the back cover, representing the Hello! Project initials. The first pressing came with a 100-page photobook.

Track listing
"All for One & One for All!" – 05:46
 – 05:25
Performed by Atsuko Inaba, Masae Ohtani, Ayumi Shibata and Aya Matsuura.
 – 03:59
Performed by Reina Tanaka, Megumi Murakami and Airi Suzuki.
"All for One & One for All!" (Instrumental) – 05:43

Featured members
Morning Musume
Kaori Iida, Mari Yaguchi, Hitomi Yoshizawa, Rika Ishikawa, Ai Takahashi, Asami Konno, Makoto Ogawa, Risa Niigaki, Miki Fujimoto, Eri Kamei, Sayumi Michishige & Reina Tanaka
W
Nozomi Tsuji & Ai Kago
Country Musume
Asami Kimura, Mai Satoda & Miuna Saito
Melon Kinenbi
Hitomi Saito, Megumi Murata, Masae Ohtani & Ayumi Shibata
v-u-den
Rika Ishikawa, Erika Miyoshi & Yui Okada
Berryz Kobo
Saki Shimizu, Momoko Tsugunaga, Chinami Tokunaga, Maasa Sudo, Miyabi Natsuyaki, Maiha Ishimura, Yurina Kumai & Risako Sugaya
Hello! Project Kids (later known as Cute)
Erika Umeda, Maimi Yajima, Megumi Murakami, Saki Nakajima, Airi Suzuki, Chisato Okai & Mai Hagiwara
Soloists
Yuko Nakazawa, Natsumi Abe, Kei Yasuda, Maki Goto, Atsuko Inaba, Ayaka Kimura, Yuki Maeda & Aya Matsuura

Personnel
Track 1
Lyrics & composition – Tsunku
Arrangement – Hideyuki "Daichi" Suzuki
Track 2
Lyrics & composition – Tsunku
Arrangement – Yuichi Takahashi
Track 3
Lyrics & composition – Tsunku
Arrangement – Shōichirō Hirata

References

External links
All for One & One for All! at the Up-Front Works discography
All for One & One for All! at Tsunku's official site (Japanese)

2004 albums